István Gajda (born 6 June 1981 in Budapest – 26 November 2011 in Pákozd) was a Hungarian football player, his latest club was Békéscsaba 1912 Előre SE.

Death
On 26 November 2011 Gajda, his brother and a friend headed home after Udinese – Roma Italian Cup match, on the M7 motorway near Pákozd, when their car crashed into a truck. The player was asleep in the back seat without a seatbelt, was thrown out from the vehicle and died instantly.

References

HLSZ 

1981 births
2011 deaths
Road incident deaths in Hungary
Footballers from Budapest
Hungarian footballers
Association football forwards
Ferencvárosi TC footballers
Lombard-Pápa TFC footballers
Celldömölki VSE footballers
Diósgyőri VTK players
AC Oulu players
BFC Siófok players
Budapest Honvéd FC players
Kaposvölgye VSC footballers
Szigetszentmiklósi TK footballers
BKV Előre SC footballers
Békéscsaba 1912 Előre footballers
Hungarian expatriate footballers
Expatriate footballers in Finland
Hungarian expatriate sportspeople in Finland